The 1962 Central Norfolk by-election was held on 22 November 1962 after the death of the incumbent Conservative MP, Richard Collard.  It was retained by the Conservative candidate Ian Gilmour.

Andrews serving in the British Armed Forces.  The law stated that, on standing in a Parliamentary election, he would be released from the Forces; this was, therefore, a way to receive an early honourable discharge, for the cost of a lost deposit.  The practice was banned the following year.

References

By-elections to the Parliament of the United Kingdom in Norfolk constituencies
1962 elections in the United Kingdom
1962 in England
20th century in Norfolk